Blastenia is a genus of lichenized fungi belonging to the family Teloschistaceae. The genus was first described in 1852 by Abramo Bartolommeo Massalongo.

The genus has cosmopolitan distribution.

Species include:

Blastenia acaciae 
Blastenia albidopallens 
Blastenia alboflavida

References

External links
Blastenia occurrence data and images from GBIF

Teloschistales
Lichen genera
Teloschistales genera
Taxa named by Abramo Bartolommeo Massalongo
Taxa described in 1852